Carniella schwendingeri is a species of comb-footed spider in the family Theridiidae. It is found in Thailand.

References

Theridiidae
Spiders described in 1996
Spiders of Asia